Sri Raja Vairicherla Veerabhadra Raju Bahadur Garu (born 6 September 1877) was an Indian aristocrat and politician who served as the hereditary zamindar of Kurupam from September 1891 and as a member of the Madras Legislative Council

Early life and education 

Veerabhadra Raja Bahadur was born to Suryanarayana Raja, the then zamindar of Kurupam in Vizianagaram district on 6 September 1877. He was privately educated by Mr. F. A. Moss

Political career 

Veerabhadra became the zamindar of Kurupam with the title of Raja on the death of his father in September 1891. He, subsequently, entered politics in the early 1900s and was appointed member of the Newington Advisory Board of Madras in 1905. In 1906, he was nominated as an additional member to the Madras Legislative Council.

Family 

On 19 May 1897, Veerabhadra married Sri Rani Sahiba Lakshmi Narasayamma Patta Mahadevi Garu, the second daughter of G. N. Gajapathi Rao. The couple had two sons and a daughter.

 Raja Vyricherla Narasimha Suryanarayana Raju Bahadur Garu (1898-1926)
 Sri Sri Sri Vyricherla Narayana Gajapathi Raju Bahadur Garu (b. 1900)
 Rani Sri Janaki Ratnayamma Garu (1899-1944)

References 

 
 
 

1877 births
Year of death missing
Andhra Pradesh politicians
Members of the Imperial Legislative Council of India
People from Vizianagaram district
19th-century Indian politicians
20th-century Indian politicians
Politicians from British India